Niccolò or Nicola Roccatagliata (1593–1636) was an Italian sculptor, mainly active in Venice.

Born in Genoa, he is mainly remembered for his work in the church of San Giorgio Maggiore in Venice including bronze statuettes of St George and St Stephen (1590), as well as twenty-eight sconces in the form of putti, and two large candelabra. In 1633, he completed a highly emotive relief depicting an Allegory of the Redemption for the church of  San Moisè in Venice.

References

External links
European sculpture and metalwork, a collection catalog from The Metropolitan Museum of Art Libraries (fully available online as PDF), which contains material on Roccatagliata (see index)

1593 births
1636 deaths
Republic of Venice sculptors
16th-century Italian sculptors
Italian male sculptors
Italian Baroque sculptors